Victor Eugene Bianchini (born 1938) is a retired State of California Superior Court Judge and a retired, U.S. Magistrate Judge, with service in the Southern District of California, the Central District of California, the Western District of New York, the Northern District of New York, and the Eastern District of Washington.  Bianchini served as a judge, for both the state and federal courts continuously for over 48 years, during which period he was honored numerous times.  Bianchini now practices as a full-time private neutral mediator and arbitrator. Bianchini is a decorated United States Marine Corps colonel with 31 years of service, active and reserve.  Bianchini is also an American sabre fencer and is a two-time World Team champion and a World Team silver and bronze medalist, a former 2012 individual U.S. National Champion, most recently won the Sabre individual National Championships for 2021 and 2022, and is a four-time North American Cup champion in Veteran competition.  He has qualified for nine Veterans World Championships, and has finished sixth, seventh, and tenth twice, in individual competition. He was also a bronze medalist in the 2013 Maccabiah Games in Jerusalem in the 40's age division, and a bronze and silver medalist in the 2022 Maccabiah Games in Tel Aviv in the 35's age division.

Early life and education 

Born in San Pedro, California in 1938, to a Jewish mother, Judith (Nee' Ben Kiki) Bianchini  and Catholic father, Henry Bianchini, he is the second oldest of six siblings. One of his brothers, Henry Bianchini, is an artist based in Hawaii.  His great-grandfather Shmuel Ben Kiki and grandfather Hayyim Ben Kiki were the chief Rabbis and Rabbinical Judges of Tiberias, Palestine, now Israel.  The Ben Kiki family immigrated to Palestine from Rabat, Morocco in the 1800s.  Bianchini is a first generation American.  Bianchini's mother was a native of Tiberias, Palestine, and legally blind her entire life.  His father, a native of Naples, Italy, was a career officer of the United States Navy. Relocating extensively because of his father's Naval service, he spent his early years in San Pedro, California, his WWII years in Saint Thomas, U.S. Virgin Islands, and Paterson, New Jersey, and his post-WWII years in Argentia, Newfoundland, Quonset Point, Rhode Island and finally settling, at the age of 13, in San Diego, California.  He attended and graduated from San Diego High School (SDHS) and was inducted by the SDHS Alumni Association to its "Wall of Honor in 2005."  He received a Bachelor of Arts degree in political science from the San Diego State University College of Arts & Letters in 1960, where he had extensive involvement in student government and was named to Who's Who in American Colleges and Universities.  He received a Juris Doctor degree from the University of San Diego School of Law in 1963 and a Certificate in Judicial Development with an emphasis in Alternative Dispute Resolution from the National Judicial College, Reno, Nevada in 1995.

Judicial service 

After graduating from law school, Judge Bianchini served as the confidential law clerk to Chief U.S. District Court Judge James Marshall Carter of the Southern District of California from 1963 to 1964.  Judge Carter was the supervising judge of the Southern Division of the Southern District of California at that time, became the founding Chief Judge of the newly designated Southern District and transferred from the newly designated Central District in 1966, and was later elevated to the United States Court of Appeals for the Ninth Circuit in 1967.

Since then, Bianchini served as a judge, both state and federal, continuously for 48 years. He served as a U.S. Commissioner from 1968 to 1969, a U.S. Magistrate from 1974 to 1982, a San Diego County Municipal Court judge from 1982 to 1998 and California State Superior Court judge in San Diego County from 1998 to 2002. After retiring from the Superior Court in 2002, Bianchini was recalled to duty in 2002 with the Federal Courts as a United States magistrate judge and continually served until December 28, 2021.   He was first recalled to the Western District of New York (Buffalo and Rochester), then served simultaneously in both the Western and Northern Districts of New York until 2013.  He then transferred and served with the Eastern District of Washington (Spokane, Yakima) for two years, and served in the United States District Court for the Central District of California (Los Angeles, Santa Ana & Riverside) from 2015 to 2022. He volunteered frequently in his home district of the Southern District of California (San Diego) from 2006 to 2017.

In addition to his extensive part-time duties on the federal bench, where he settled complex civil cases, prisoner civil rights cases, decided writs of habeas corpus and Social Security disability appeals cases until the end of 2021, Bianchini continues to practice as a private neutral mediator and arbitrator for Judicate West (2002–2007, 2012–present), a mediation and arbitration service, as well as for the American Arbitration Association.

Bianchini has authored over 2,000 federal court opinions, primarily on writs of habeas corpus and Social Security Disability Appeal decisions, both in the 2nd and 9th Federal Circuits, most of which are published either in the Federal Supplement or on the legal research sites of Westlaw and Lexis.

Notable cases 

In People v. Sherrod, 59 Cal.App.4th 1168 (4th District Court of Appeals, California, Division 1, 1997),  appeal from the San Diego Superior Court grant of new trial. New trial granted on the basis that a denial of continuance prejudiced the Defendant, because of inability to prepare.  Affirmed by the 4th District Court of Appeals California, Division 1.

In Brinson v. Walker, 407 F. Supp. 2d 456 (W.D.N.Y. 2006); Brinson v. Walker 457 F.3d 387 (2d Cir. 2008), Habeas granted on basis that the trial judge's ruling erroneously deprived the applicant of his right to cross-examine the complaining witness to demonstrate the witness's racial prejudice and his motive to testify untruthfully.  Affirmed by the 2d Circuit Court of Appeals.

In D’Alessandro v. Mukasey, 628 F.Supp.2d 368 (W.D.N.Y. 2009), Granted Habeas relief to a petitioner in poor physical health after being detained for 15 months by ICE; ordered ICE to immediately release him on bond.  Affirmed by the 2d Circuit Court of Appeals.  See also, bail request.

Robles v. Dennison, 745 F.Supp.2d 244 (W.D.N.Y.); Reluctant Denial of Habeas relief based on New York liberty interest considerations.

Jackson v. Conway,  765 F.Supp.2d 192 (W.D.N.Y.2011);   Habeas granted based on ineffective assistance of counsel; Affirmed in part by 2d Circuit: Jackson v. Conway, 763 F.3d 115 (2d Cir. 2014);.

Dearstyne v. Mazzuca, 48 F.Supp. 3d, 222 (N.D.N.Y. 2011); Habeas recommended based on involuntary confession, ineffective assistance of Counsel. Dearstyne v. Mazzuca, 2015 and ultimately affirmed in part by 2d Circuit on involuntary confession grounds.   U.S. Dist. LEXIS 110587; Order 2d Circuit.

Legal profession awards 

Bianchini was inducted by the San Diego High School (SDHS) Alumni Association to its "Wall of Honor in 2005.  He was honored with two awards by the San Diego Trial Lawyers (Consumer Attorneys of San Diego) in 1991, including "Trial Judge of the Year", and the "President's Award for as "Soldier, Statesman, Jurist,". He also received the Foothills Bar Association Legal Professional of the Year award in 2001, received Family Law Judge of the Year Honors from the El Cajon Superior Court. He was named the Poway School District "Volunteer of the Year" in 2007 for service as the debate and moot court coach for Mr. Carmel High School.  He was recognized by the 9th Circuit Pro Se Committee for "Excellence In Pro Se Case Management Strategies" in 2016 for his prisoner civil rights settlement work.  He has been named a “Legend of the Bar” by the San Diego County Bar Association's “oral history project", was recognized as a Distinguished Alumni of San Diego State University in 2018 and was awarded the prestigious Bernard E. Witkin Award, by the San Diego County Law Library in 2019 for “Excellence in Adjudication of the Law.

Community service 

Bianchini has served on numerous boards, councils and organizations.  He was chairman of the University of San Diego School of Law Board of Visitors from 1978 to 1979.  He also volunteered for service as an AAU boxing referee for the Community Youth Athletic Association (previously, the Chicano Athletic Association) from 1978 to 1980, and discontinued when the head coach and executive director, Junior Robles, was killed in a tragic airplane crash in Poland carrying the U.S. Boxing Team. He was President of the San Diego County Law Library board of trustees, and President of the San Diego County Law Library Justice Foundation in the 1990s. He presently holds a voluntary position with the San Diego Law Library Foundation (director and past president) on which he continues to serve as a director. Most recently, he was a director and vice president of the San Diego County Bar Association (2019-2021)and also served as a director on the San Diego County Bar Association Board of Directors from 1978 to 1980 as director, treasurer, and vice president.  He has served on the Board of Governors and the Judicial Advisory Committee of the Association of Business Trial Lawyers San Diego (ABTL) as community outreach co-chair of the Trial Attorney Program (TAP), and serves on the Veterans Advisory Councils of both San Diego State University, and the University of San Diego School of Law.  Immediately after his release from Marine Corps active service in 1967, he served as a volunteer at Kibbutz Ein Gev, Tiberias, Israel for approximately six months prior to entering into private law practice in the U.S.

Bianchini is the immediate past chairman of the Flying Leatherneck Aviation Museum's Historical Foundation, leaving his position on September 15, 2022.  He was succeeded by Lieutennt General Terry G. Robling, USMC, Retired.  He was recently inducted to the Flying Leathernecks Foundation Wall of Honor.  He served as the president of the Marine Corps Recruit Depot Historical Foundation from 2007 to 2010; is the past vice chair of the Veterans Village of San Diego (VVSD), as well as life member and former director on the Marine Corps Reserve Association governing board, from which he resigned in 2021.  He is a life member of the Force Reconnaissance Association, a life member of the United States Marine Corps Combat Correspondents Association, a life member of the Disabled American Veterans, a member of the U.S.M.C. Combat Helicopter and Tiltrotor Association(“Pop-a-Smoke”), and a life member of the Jewish War Veterans.

He was the 2020 - 2021 President of the San Diego Kiwanis Foundation; and his service was recognized with the "Don McKee Spirit of Service" Award for 2020-2021.

Teaching 
Bianchini has held numerous professorships.  He served as an associate professor in business law at San Diego State University from 1969 to 1973, the foreign student advisor (now named International Student Advisor) and the legal advisor to the Associated Student Body.  He also served as the Chairman of the University of San Diego School of Law (USD) Board of Visitors for the years 1978 and 1979. He later became an adjunct professor and administrator, chair of the Criminal Justice and Business Law departments of National University, and the founding dean of National University's law school from (June 1978 – 1981), and professor of business law (1978–1998).  He taught Thomas Jefferson School of Law, specializing in the field of evidence, for almost 12 years. Bianchini also taught evidence law at the National Judicial College, and during that time was a member of the its faculty council and earned a Certificate in Judicial Development with an emphasis on alternative dispute resolution in 1995. In connection with a Rule of Law teaching team from the National Judicial College, Bianchini lectured in Kazakhstan and Kyrgyzstan by way of Moscow in the 1990s.

In the 1980s, he gave a series of evidence lectures at the San Diego Trial Lawyers' (now Consumer Attorneys of San Diego) lecture series.  In addition, he held positions on the faculty of the California Continuing Judicial Studies Program (CJER) (1987–1998).

Immediately prior to his retirement from the superior court in 2002, he was selected by the U.S. State Department to serve, during a leave of absence from his Superior Court duties, as a Senior Fulbright Scholar as part of the Fulbright Program to the Sub-Saharan African country of Eritrea, where he served as consultant to the Minister of Justice, wrote the judiciary's Code of Conduct, crafted a 2,000-page judicial education syllabus for its National Judiciary, and taught South African Law to a select group of Eritrean judges.

Personal life 
Bianchini has three daughters.  He is a former owner of a Beechcraft Bonanza, and holds commercial, multi-engine, instrument, and helicopter licenses, and is a rated captain in the Cessna Citation C500.

Fencing 

Bianchini began the sport of sabre fencing at the age of 72 in 2010, and became a three-time United States National Champion (2012, 2021, and 2022), a four-time North American Champion (2019–2021), a two-time World Sabre Fencing Team champion gold medalist in Veterans Fencing in Varna, Bulgaria in 2013, and Debrecen, Hungary in 2014, a Veteran World Sabre Team Bronze medalist In Stralsund, Germany in 2016, and a Veteran World Team Silver medalist in Maribor, Slovenia in 2017.   In 2013, he qualified for the USA Fencing Team to the World Maccabiah Games in Jerusalem, Israel and competing in the 40 year-old division at the age of 75 he won 3rd place Bronze.  In 2022, at the 21st Maccabiah Games in Tel Aviv, he won 3rd place Bronze in the 35 years old division at the age of 84, and won 2nd place Silver in Epee Team.  In 2019 he served as the USA Team Fencing Coach for the European Maccabiah Games for Juniors and Cadets, held in Budapest, Hungary.  Prior to 2021 he had qualified for and attended eight Veteran's World championships. In 2021, he qualified for his ninth World Championship in the 70s division at the age of 83, while also competing in the 80s division; however, the competition was cancelled because of COVID.  In 2011, he placed 6th in individual competition at the Veterans World Championships in, Porec, Croatia, placed 7th in Varna, Bulgaria and 10th twice in successive World Championships.  He has participated in the Canadian/American Fencing Championships held in Markham/Thornhill, Toronto Canada on numerous occasions, earning 1st place Gold on a number of occasions in his age group.  He is currently ranked 1st in the Nation in Veterans Sabre 80's age group, and 7th in the Nation in the 70's age group, both in Sabre.  He is ranked 5th in the nation in 80's Épée.  He has won over 100 medals in his competitions since 2010.

He also serves on USA Fencing organizations, including the Legal Resources Committee and the Veterans Committee.

Military service 
Victor Bianchini served for 31 years in the United States Marine Corps, active and reserve, retiring as a colonel.  He has remained active in military support groups and veteran affairs.

Bianchini first enlisted in the United States Marine Corps in 1959 and entered commissioned service in September 1960.  He served as a tank platoon commander with the 4th Tank Battalion from 1960 to 1961.  He then served as a force reconnaissance platoon commander with the 4th Force Reconnaissance Company from 1962 to 1964. He attended and successfully completed the United States Army Airborne School in 1963.  Upon completion of his federal judiciary clerkship, he was called to active duty in 1964. His active duty included a 13-month tour in the Republic of Vietnam including as a special staff officer to the commanding general, officer in charge (OIC) of the 1st Marine Aircraft Wing Photo Labs, the Wing civil affairs officer, combat correspondent, and combat air crewman, during which time he parachuted with the Army of Republic of Vietnam Forces (ARVN).  For a brief time in Vietnam, he was trial and defense counsel for courts-martial.  He was also a trial and defense counsel at Marine Corps Air Station Iwakuni, Japan, Marine Corps Air Station Cherry Point, North Carolina, and Marine Corps Recruit Depot San Diego.

Bianchini left active service in 1967 and remained in the Reserves.  In 1968, he rejoined the 4th Force Reconnaissance Company in 1968 and served as the unit's operations officer, the executive officer, commanding officer and the unit's jumpmaster.  From 1971 to 1981, he served in numerous summertime assignments at Headquarters Marine Corps, the board for Correction of Naval Records, acting Staff Judge Advocate (SJA) at MCRD San Diego and Marine Corps Forces, Pacific (Camp Smith).  From 1976 until 1983, he served as the commanding officer of the Mobilization Training Unit (MTU Law) 12–1 in San Diego.  In  1984 he then became the officer in charge (OIC) and senior military judge of the Reserve Military Judges Unit, Sierra Circuit, Camp Pendleton. In 1987, he served as a special staff officer, Marine Corps Reserve Support Command (MCRSC) in Overland Park, Kansas.  In 1988 through 1991, he served as the deputy inspector general, United States European Command (USEUCOM) in Vaihingen, Germany.  During that tour, he was recalled to active duty during Desert Shield/Desert Storm and served as an Inspector General Investigator at Headquarters, Marine Corps, while still retaining his status as the deputy inspector general of USEUCOM.  Bianchini retired from his recall to active service and from EUCOM as a colonel in July 1991.

Bianchini's formal military education includes the United States Marne Corps Tank and Amphibious Tractor Course at Camp Pendleton, California, 1961, the United States Army Airborne School at Fort Benning, Georgia, 1963, his 4th Force Reconnaissance Unit's jump-master course 1964, the Marine Corps Officer's Basic School 1964-1965, Naval Justice School, (West Coast Session, Camp Pendleton) 1965, the MACV Civil Affairs Advisors Officer Orientation Course, Saigon, Vietnam 1965, Command & Staff College, Phase I, Quantico, Virginia 1974, Army Military Judges Course at the University of Virginia and was certified as a military trial judge for military courts-martial 1984, and the NATO Senior Officers' Orientation Course, Oberamagau, Germany 1988.

In 2003, Bianchini was appointed by the Secretary of the Navy to serve on limited active duty on the Secretary of the Navy's Navy & Marine Corps Retiree Council, serving for three years from 2003 to 2005.

Military awards 

Bianchini received the following military awards and decorations:

 Marine Corps Rifle Sharpshooter Badge
 Marine Corps Pistol Expert Badge with requalification clasp to signify 2nd Award

References 

1938 births
People from San Pedro, Los Angeles
University of San Diego School of Law alumni
20th-century American judges
United States Marine Corps colonels
Living people
United States magistrate judges
Fulbright alumni
San Diego High School alumni